Young-ae, also spelled Yong-ae, is a Korean female given name.

People with this name include:
Kim Young-ae (1951–2017), South Korean actress
Kim Young-ae (politician) (김영애, born 1964), South Korean politician from Ulsan
Kim Yong Ae (born 1985), North Korean footballer who represented North Korea at the 2008 Summer Olympics
Lee Young-ae (born 1971), South Korean actress
Ri Yong-Ae (born 1965), North Korean long jumper

See also
List of Korean given names

Korean feminine given names